Hobbs Quarry may refer to:

Hobbs Quarry SSSI, Longhope
Hobbs Quarry SSSI, Shepton Mallet